Ludwig von Bogdandy (born 10 February 1930 in Berlin, died 5 May 1996 in Linz) was a German metallurgist and industrial executive. He was a leading researcher on iron and steel production, and served as CEO of Voestalpine, an international steel based technology and capital goods group based in Linz. He also served as the honorary Hungarian Consul-General in Linz.

Family

Ludwig von Bogdandy was a son of the Hungarian physical chemist Stefan von Bogdándy, who moved to Berlin in the 1920s, and was the father of the legal scholar Armin von Bogdandy.

Career

He earned a Habilitation at RWTH Aachen University in 1959, and became associate professor at the same university in 1965. In 1985 he was awarded an honorary doctorate in engineering. He was a member of the board of directors of Thyssen Niederrhein and managing director of the Klöckner Works. From 1986 to 1988 he was a member of the board of directors and from 1988 to 1992 chairman of the board of directors and CEO of Voestalpine. From 1990 to 1992 he was a member of the board of directors of Österreichische Industrieholding, which administers the investments of the Republic of Austria in partially or entirely nationalized companies. He was Hungarian Consul-General in Linz from 1993.

He received the Grand Decoration of Honour for Services to the Republic of Austria and was a Knight of Honour of the Order of Saint John. The Ludwig von Bogdandy Award, which is awarded by RWTH Aachen University, is named in his honour.

Works 
 Die Reduktion der Eisenerze: wissenschaftliche Grundlagen und technische Durchführung, Stahleisen, Düsseldorf 1967 (with Hans-Jürgen Engell)
 Anwendung der Desoxydationskinetik auf die Herstellung halbberuhigten Stahles, Stahleisen, Düsseldorf 1969
 Aktuelle Entwicklungstendenzen der Phosphorchemie, Westdt. Verlag, Opladen 1986 (with Marianne Baudler)

References

German metallurgists
German chief executives
German people of Hungarian descent
Recipients of the Grand Decoration for Services to the Republic of Austria
1930 births
1996 deaths
Engineers from Berlin
Academic staff of RWTH Aachen University